Biritera (International title: Diva) is a 2012 Philippine television drama musical series broadcast by GMA Network. Directed by Maryo J. de los Reyes, it stars Dennis Trillo, Angelika dela Cruz, Glaiza de Castro and Roseanne Magan in the title role. It premiered February 6, 2012 on the network's Telebabad line up replacing Munting Heredera. The series concluded on May 18, 2012 with a total of 73 episodes. It was replaced by Luna Blanca in its timeslot.

Cast and characters

Lead cast
 Dennis Trillo as Andrei Marcelino 
 Roseanne Magan as Roseanne Abigail Marcelino Fuentebella
 Angelika Dela Cruz as Remedios "Remy" Kapitolyo Fuentebella 
 Glaiza de Castro as Mikaela / Mikmik

Supporting cast
 Ryan Eigenmann as Dalton "Mr. D" Dimaano
 Yul Servo as Jerome Macapagal
 Ces Quesada as Simang Kapitolyo 
 Rich Asuncion as Josephine "Jo" Abesamis
 Gwen Zamora as Iris
 Neil Ryan Sese as Eric Fuentebella
 Barbara Miguel as Darling
 Sweet Ramos as Barbie Tamondong
 Scarlet as Mrs. Mylene Tamondong

Guest cast
 Jaya as Susie
 Orlando Sol as Egay
 Ken Chan as Popoy
 Kiel Rodriguez as Miko
 Patricia Ysmael as Beverly
 Kim Rodriguez as Gwen
 Hiro Magalona as Teofi
 Jamaika Olivarez as Kleng Kleng
 Nomer Limatog Jr. as Miguelito
 Tanya Gomez as Krising
 Mary Roldan as Cecile
 Myra Carel as Bevs
 Moi Scarlet as Mrs. Tamondong
 Claudine Barretto as Carmela Abesamis
 Jillian Ward as Louie May Imperial
 Glenda Garcia as Marissa Marcelino
 Rachelle Ann Go as Lara
 Miguel Tanfelix as teen Andrei
 Romano Vasquez as Lito
 Bubbles Paraiso as herself
 Gerald Pizzaras as Paco Arcega
 Jan Marini as Mariel Arcega
 Ernie Garcia as Mauro Fuentebella
 Evangeline Pascual as Olivia Fuentebella
 Bettina Carlos as Clarissa
 Chinggay Riego as Darling's mother

Reception

Ratings
According to AGB Nielsen Philippines' Mega Manila household television ratings, the pilot episode of Biritera earned a 24.8% rating. While the final episode scored a 29.9% rating.

Critical response
Both Dennis Trillo and Angelika Dela Cruz's performances were praised by critics and audience saying that having accomplished leads in the persona of Trillo and dela Cruz in clean-cut bida roles helps greatly in forging a connection to the story this early. After his recent roles in TV and film had him taking on more maangas, bad boy hero characters, it is a welcome change to see Trillo in a more good guy, older brother role. For [dela Cruz, this is her first opportunity for a long time to play as a heroine instead of an antagonist. And while she may be effective in villainous roles, dela Cruz has shown she is capable of much more. While Biritera may be a harmless family drama, it would be nice to see both Dennis Trillo and Angelika dela Cruz given great material, not to mention a promising and witty young cast. Though a simple premise, the first two weeks have shown Biritera can be a fully satisfying drama with opportunities for depth.

References

2012 Philippine television series debuts
2012 Philippine television series endings
Filipino-language television shows
GMA Network drama series
Philippine musical television series
Television shows set in the Philippines